Seli is a subdistrict in the district of Lasnamäe, Tallinn, the capital of Estonia. It has a population of 13,039.

References

Subdistricts of Tallinn